A motte-and-bailey is a form of castle, with a wooden or stone keep situated on a raised earthwork called a motte, accompanied by an enclosed courtyard, or bailey, surrounded by a protective ditch and palisade. Relatively easy to build with unskilled, often forced labour, but still militarily formidable, these castles were built across northern Europe from the 10th century onwards, spreading from Normandy and Anjou in France, into the Holy Roman Empire in the 11th century. The Normans introduced the design into England and Wales following their invasion in 1066. Motte-and-bailey castles were adopted in Scotland, Ireland, the Low Countries and Denmark in the 12th and 13th centuries. By the end of the 13th century, the design was largely superseded by alternative forms of fortification, but the earthworks remain a prominent feature in many countries.

Belgium

 Gravensteen

France
 Château de Gisors

Ireland

Ardee
Ballymoty Motte
Belturbet
Castleruddery Motte
Clough Castle
Coleraine Castle
Dún Dealgan Motte
Fore Motte & Bailey
Gortlownan Motte
Granard Motte
Greencastle
Greenmount Motte
Knockgraffon
Lemonstown Motte
Lickbla Motte & Bailey
Moybologue (Relaghbeg) Motte & Bailey
Navan Motte
Portlick Motte
Rathgarve Motte & Bailey
Roscrea Castle

South Italy and Sicily
Specchia Torricella near Supersano (Apulia)
Vaccarizza near Troia (Apulia)
Castle of Arechi (Salerno, Campania)
San Marco Argentano (Calabria)
Spezzano Albanese near Scribla (Calabria)
Aci Castello (Sicily)
Castle of Adrano (Sicily)
Castle of Paternò (Sicily)
Motta Sant'Anastasia (Sicily)
Petralia Soprana (Sicily)
Ponticelli of Segesta near Monte Barbaro (Sicily)

The Netherlands
 Burcht van Leiden

United Kingdom

England
A study by castellologist D. J. Cathcart King published in 1972 listed 473 mottes in England.

 Aldford Castle
 Alnwick Castle
 Arundel Castle
 Baile Hill
 Bedford Castle
 Berkeley Castle
 Berkhamsted Castle
 Brinklow Castle
 Carisbrooke Castle
 Castle Acre Castle
 Castle Neroche
 Caus Castle
 Chartley Castle
 Christchurch Castle
 Clare Castle
 Clifford Castle
 Clitheroe Castle
 Corfe Castle
 Cuckney Castle
 Cymbeline's Castle
 Dorstone Castle
 Dudley Castle
 Durham Castle
 Eardisland Castle
 Eardisley Castle
 Edburton Castle Ring
 Ewyas Harold Castle
 Eye Castle
 Farnham Castle
 Fenny Castle 
 FitzHarris Castle
 Fotheringhay Castle
 Hastings Castle
 Holwell Castle, Parracombe
 Kilpeck Castle
 Launceston Castle
 Lewes Castle
 Leafield Castle
 Lincoln Castle
 Longtown Castle
 Montacute Castle
 Nether Stowey
 Norwich Castle
 Nottingham Castle
 Okehampton Castle
 Old Sarum Castle
 Ongar Castle
 Oxford Castle
 Pickering Castle
 Pleshey Castle
 Reigate Castle
 Sandal Castle
 Skipsea Castle
 Stafford Castle
 Stansted Mountfitchet Castle
 Tamworth Castle
 Thetford Castle
 Tonbridge Castle
 Totnes Castle
 Totternhoe Castle
 Tutbury Castle
 Wallingford Castle
 Warkworth Castle
 Warwick Castle
 Windsor Castle
 York Castle

Scotland

Canmore has records for 47 motte-and-bailey castles in Scotland.
 Doune of Invernochty, Aberdeenshire
 Duffus Castle, Moray
 Hermitage Castle, Liddesdale
 Liddel Castle, Liddesdale
 Motte of Urr, Dumfries and Galloway
 Tibbers Castle, Dumfries and Galloway

Northern Ireland
Dromore Castle

Wales
A 1972 study found 268 mottes in Wales.

 Aberlleiniog Castle
 Buddugre Castle
 Cardiff Castle
 Lampeter Castle
 Llandovery Castle
 Mold Castle
 Montgomery or Hen Domen
 Morganstown Castle Mound  
 New Radnor
 Prestatyn Castle
 The Rofft
 Ruperra Motte
 St Quentins Castle
 Tomen Castell
 Twmpath Castle
 Wiston Castle
 Wolfscastle
 Twyn Castell (Gelligaer)

References

Notes

Bibliography

External links

motte-and-bailey